Major General Sir James Holborne of Menstrie was a Scottish soldier during the years of the English Civil War. He eventually reached the rank of Major General and fought with the Parliamentarians during the English Civil War, fighting at Newbury and Taunton. Although he initially fought on the side of the English Parliament, he later became a senior officer in the Scottish Army, fighting against Cromwell. He lived at Menstrie Castle, in Menstrie, Clackmannanshire, central Scotland, which he had purchased in 1649.

Action in the Civil War

James Holborne led a brigade of infantry in the Parliamentarian army of the Earl of Essex at the first Battle of Newbury in 1643. He was with Sir William Waller's army at the Battle of Cropredy Bridge on 29 June 1644. At Stowe St Mary, near Tavistock, in January 1645, Sydenham House, a large Elizabethan mansion on the banks of the River Lyd, then being garrisoned for the King, was taken by Colonel Holborne. In April that year, Holborne was offered command of a regiment of foot in the New Model Army, but like several prominent Scottish and Presbyterian officers, he declined.

Holborne was a Major General by 1645, when he was nominated, with the Earl of Leven, and Lord Kirkcudbright, as a deputation from the Convention of Estates, the most powerful party in Scotland at that time, to open negotiations with Oliver Cromwell, whose army was then at Berwick. On 4 October 1648 Cromwell made his first visit to Edinburgh. The Lord Kirkcudbright and Major General Holborne conducted him into the city, where he was lodged in the Earl of Moray's house in the Canongate.

By the autumn of 1650, James Holborne was fighting against Cromwell at the Battle of Dunbar. After the defeat of the Covenanting army by Cromwell at Dunbar, Charles II had been crowned by Argyll at Scone in Scotland, assuming personal command of the Scottish army, he managed to restrain Cromwell at Stirling for a month. Cromwell tried to turn the Scottish flank by sending a force under Colonel Overton into Fife. To defeat this attempt, Charles sent forward a contingent under two officers, Brown and James Holborne of Menstrie, with twelve hundred horse and fifteen hundred infantry, and on Sunday 20 July a battle took place on the north shore of the Forth at Inverkeithing. In that encounter, Holborne showed himself uncertain of his new allegiance. At the beginning of the battle Holborne fled with his cavalry, and although Brown, with a small force of infantry under Sir Hector Maclean and Sir George Buchanan fought bravely, they were defeated, the army being 'cut to pieces'.

Major General Holborne later arrived at Ardvreck Castle, Sutherland, as escort for James Graham, Marquis of Montrose, who was held captive by Neil Macleod after his defeat at Carbisdale, to be led to Edinburgh by a troop of horse by order of General David Leslie to meet his judges and his death on 4 May 1650. On 5 May, Montrose thus begun his long and humiliating captive journey, and on 6 May, Major General Holborne took shelter at Skibo Castle, the home of the dowager Lady Gray. Lady Gray, being loyal to the King, requested Montrose to be seated next to her at dinner. Major General Holborne insisted on a strict military order to affairs, and placed the Marquis between himself and another officer. With this breach of etiquette, the Lady Gray flew into a violent rage, and seizing upon a leg of roasted mutton by the shank she confronted the Major General with "such a notable blow on his head, knocking him of his seat."

The officers took alarm, expecting an attempt to rescue their prisoner. Lady Gray promptly reminded them that they were her guests and as such, as gentleman they should accommodate themselves to such an adjustment of place at her table, as she considered to be correct. Order having been restored, mutton replaced to the table, every possible civility was thereafter directed by all present toward the Marquis.

On 7 May, Montrose was ferried across Dornoch Firth to Tain, where General David Leslie took personal command of the procession. Montrose was led down the east coast of Scotland on the long journey toward Edinburgh, where he was met at the town's Watergate and the sentence of hanging, drawing and quartering was pronounced.

Family
One "James Holburn" was recorded as having married Helen Millar on 29 July 1680 at Muthill, Perthshire in Scotland. A reference in the International Genealogical Index records a second marriage, to Margaret Gordon, which took place on 30 August 1682 at Monimail, Fife.

Holborne's son, also named James (d. 1737), was admitted as advocate on 23 November 1714, becoming thereafter an Examiner in the Exchequer. This James was married at first to Janet Inglis of Cramond, and later to Jean, the daughter of Alexander Spital of Leuchat. His son, another James (d. 1758), was created a baronet in 1706, in the Baronetage of Nova Scotia.

Among the descendants of Major General Holburne are Sir Alexander Holburn, 3rd Baronet, Admiral Sir Francis Holburne, and Thomas William Holborne, 5th Baronet, founder of the Holburne Museum of Art in Bath, all of whom served in the Royal Navy.

Major General Holborne was a relation of Sir Robert Holborne, the attorney general of King James I.

See also
Menstrie Castle
Holburn Baronets

References 

Year of death missing
Scottish soldiers
Roundheads
Year of birth unknown
17th-century Scottish people